Hikaru Utada Laughter in the Dark Tour 2018 was Japanese-American singer-songwriter Hikaru Utada's fourth Japanese tour. The 13-date sold-out tour began in Yokohama and ended in Chiba. It was Utada's first concert in Japan in 8 years, and first concert tour in the country in 12 years. Initially, the concert tour was scheduled with 12 regular dates in arenas, but one extra concert, sponsored by Suntory, was later scheduled for November 17.

Recordings and release 
The tour was officially broadcast on the Japanese TV channels BS Sky Perfect!, in January 2019, and on M-ON, in March 2019, along with a documentary showing the behind the scenes of the tour and production process.

Two songs were recorded with 6K 180 degrees cameras for PlayStation VR, Hikari and Chikai. They were both released worldwide on PlayStation VR on January 18, 2019, the same day the single Face My Fears was released.

An official release of the full tour concert with backstage documentary was released in 3 disc set in Blu-ray and DVD formats on June 26, 2019, including an extra disc with music videos of Anata, Forevermore and Hatsukoi, along M-ON documentaries of behind the scenes. The concert is currently available on iTunes for digital download, Netflix for streaming and Sky Perfect TV for Pay per view.

Set list 

 "Anata"
 "Michi"
 "Traveling"
 "Colors"
 "Prisoner of Love"
 "Kiss & Cry" (with samples of "Can You Keep a Secret?")
 "Sakura Drops"
 "Hikari"
 "Tomodachi"
 "Too Proud"
 "Chikai"
 "Manatsu no Tooriame"
 "Hanataba o Kimi ni"
 "Forevermore"
 "First Love"
 "Hatsukoi"
 "Play a Love Song"
 "Ore no Kanojo"
 "Automatic"
 "Goodbye Happiness"

Shows 
Tour dates for Hikaru Utada Laughter in the Dark Tour 2018.

References

2018 concert tours
Hikaru Utada concert tours
Concert tours of Japan
November 2018 events in Japan
December 2018 events in Japan